The Henderson Islets are a group of two adjacent small rocky islands, with a combined area of 0.41 ha, in south-eastern Australia. They are part of Tasmania’s Trefoil Island Group, lying close to Cape Grim, Tasmania's most north-westerly point, in Bass Strait.

Fauna
The islet form part of the Hunter Island Group Important Bird Area.  Recorded breeding seabird and shorebird species include little penguin, fairy prion, sooty oystercatcher, black-faced cormorant and Caspian tern.

References

North West Tasmania
Important Bird Areas of Tasmania
Islands of Bass Strait